Sap-en-Auge (literally Sap in Auge) is a commune in the department of Orne, northwestern France. The municipality was established on 1 January 2016 by merger of the former communes of Orville and Le Sap (the seat).

See also 
Communes of the Orne department

References 

Communes of Orne
Populated places established in 2016
2016 establishments in France